A Franco-Persian alliance or Franco-Iranian alliance was formed for a short period between the French Empire of Napoleon I and Fath Ali Shah of Qajar Persia against Russia and Great Britain between 1807 and 1809. The alliance was part of a plan to gather extra aid against Russia and by Persia's help, having another front on Russia's southern borders, namely the Caucasus region. The alliance unravelled when France finally allied with Russia and turned its focus to European campaigns.

Background
Due to the traditional friendly relations of France with the Ottoman Empire  formalized by a long-standing Franco-Ottoman alliance, the relations of France with Iran had long been minimal. Instead, a Habsburg-Persian alliance had developed during the 16th century, and when Persian embassies visited Europe with the Persian embassy to Europe (1599–1602) and the Persian embassy to Europe (1609–1615), they pointedly avoided France.

First rapprochement

Later however, France developed relations with Iran and signed treaties in 1708 and 1715 with the visit of an Iranian embassy to Louis XIV, but these relations ceased in 1722 with the fall of the Safavid dynasty and the invasion of Iran by the Afghans.

Attempts to resume contact were made following the French revolution, as France was in conflict with Russia and wished to find an ally against that country. In 1796, two scientists, Jean-Guillaume Bruguières and Guillaume-Antoine Olivier, were sent to Iran by the Directoire, but were unsuccessful in obtaining an agreement.

Soon however, with the advent of Napoleon I, France adopted a strongly expansionist policy in the Mediterranean and the Near East. Following the Treaty of Campo Formio in 1797, France acquired possessions in the Mediterranean such as the Ionian islands as well as former Venetian bases on the coast of Albania and Greece, geographically close to the Middle-East.

Napoleon Bonaparte launched the French Invasion of Egypt in 1798 and fought against the Ottoman and British Empires to establish a French presence in the Middle East, with the ultimate dream of linking with a Muslim enemy of the British in India, Tipu Sultan. Napoleon assured the Directoire that "as soon as he had conquered Egypt, he will establish relations with the Indian princes and, together with them, attack the English in their possessions."<ref name="books.google.com">[https://books.google.com/books?id=n5IOAAAAQAAJ&pg=PA12 Napoleon and Iran" by Iradj Amini, p.12]</ref> According to a 13 February 1798 report by Talleyrand: "Having occupied and fortified Egypt, we shall send a force of 15,000 men from Suez to India, to join the forces of Tipu-Sahib and drive away the English."

Napoleon was initially defeated by the Ottoman Empire and Britain at the Siege of Acre in 1799, and at the Battle of Abukir in 1801; by 1802, the French were completely vanquished in the Middle East.

In order to reinforce the Western border of British India, the diplomat John Malcolm was sent to Iran to sign the Anglo-Persian Treaty of 1801. The Treaty offered English support against Russia and trade advantages, and explicitly provided against French intervention in Iran:

Soon however, from 1803, Napoleon went to great lengths to try to convince the Ottoman Empire to fight against Russia in the Balkans and join his anti-Russian coalition. Napoleon sent General Horace Sebastiani as envoy extraordinary, promising to help the Ottoman Empire recover lost territories.

In February 1806, following Napoleon's remarkable victory in the December 1805 Battle of Austerlitz and the ensuing dismemberment of the Habsburg Empire, Selim III finally recognized Napoleon as Emperor, formally opting for an alliance with France "our sincere and natural ally", and war with Russia and Britain.

Iranian alliance

Napoleon's motivation

In his grand scheme to reach India (the "India Expedition"), the next step for Napoleon was now to develop an alliance with the Persian Empire. Early 1805, Napoléon sent one of his officers Amédée Jaubert on a mission to Persia. He would return to France in October 1806.

Iranian motivation

On the other hand, the Shah of Persia needed help against the Russian menace to his northern frontiers, as Russia had annexed Eastern Georgia in 1801 following the death of George XII of Georgia. General Tsitsianov occupied Georgia against rival Iranian claims, and attacked Ganja in Iran in 1804, triggering a Russo-Persian War, and soon the Russo-Turkish War was also declared in 1806.

Britain, an ally of Russia, had been temporizing without a clear show of support. The Shah decided to respond to Napoleon's offers, sending a letter carried by ambassador Mirza Mohammed Reza-Qazvini (Mirza Riza) to the court of Napoleon, then in Tilsit in eastern Prussia. In his instructions to the ambassador, the Shah explained that:

The Shah also clearly considered helping France in the invasion of India:

The Shah however denied the possibility of providing a port to the French "on they way to Hindustan".

Alliance and military mission

Following the visit of the Iran Envoy Mirza Mohammed Reza-Qazvini to Napoleon, the Treaty of Finckenstein formalized the alliance on 4 May 1807, in which France supported Persia's claim to Georgia, promising to act so that Russia would surrender the territory. In exchange, Persia was to fight Great Britain, and to allow France to cross the Persian territory to reach India.

A military mission was also sent under General Antoine Gardanne in order to help modernize the Persian army, and in order to chart an invasion route to India. Gardanne also had the missions to coordinate Ottoman and Persian efforts against Russia. Gardanne's mission consisted in 70 commissioned and non-commissioned officers, and started to work at modernizing the Persian army along European lines. The mission arrived on 4 December 1807.

Captains of infantry Lamy and Verdier trained the Nezame Jadid (New Army), which served under Prince Abbas Mirza. This modernized army successfully defeated a Russia Army attack on the strategic city of Erevan on 29 November 1808, showing the efficiency of French training. Lieutenants of artillery Charles-Nicolas Fabvier and Reboul were sent by Gardanne to Ispahan in order to set up a factory to produce cannons for the Persian artillery, complete with foundries, lathes, machinery and instruments. Against great odds, by December 1808, they had managed to produce 20 pieces of cannon in the European style, which were transported to Tehran.

The 19th century diplomat Sir Justin Sheil commented positively on the French contribution in modernizing the Persian army:

The embassy of Gardanne to Persia soon lost one of the main reasons for its original dispatch. In a final reversal, Napoleon I finally vanquished Russia at the Battle of Friedland in July 1807, and France and Russia became allied at the Treaty of Tilsit. General Gardanne arrived in Tehran in Persia after the Treaty of Tilsit, in December 1807.

Napoleon however wished to continue fostering the Franco-Persian alliance, in order to pursue his plan of invading India. To this effect, he planned to nominate his brother Lucien Bonaparte as his representative in Tehran. Napoleon still planned to invade British India, this time with Russian help.

A Persian ambassador was sent to Paris, named Askar Khan Afshar. He arrived in Paris on 20 July 1808 and was able to meet Napoleon on 4 September 1808.

Persia however lost the main motivation for the alliance, the recovery of Georgia and Azerbaijan over Russia, which had not even been addressed at the Treaty of Tilsit.

The Franco-Persian alliance thus lost its main motivation as France and Russia were now allied. The Shah of Persia again turned to the British for military advisers. In the east, a mutual defense treaty was signed between British India and Shah Shuja al-Mulk of Afghanistan on 17 June 1809 in order to better resist the Franco-Persian threat, but by that time Persia had already denounced its alliance with France.

Return of a British alliance

After the failed mission of John Malcolm in 1808, who was only allowed to negotiate with the Governor of Fars, Sir Harford Jones managed to sign in March 1809 a preliminary treaty with Persia and General Gardanne was returned to France. In another mission in 1810, Malcolm brought a large mission of officers, one of whom, Lindsay Bethune, would become Commander-in-Chief of the Persian army for several years. In 1809–1810, the Shah sent ambassador Haji Mirza Abul Hasan Khan to the Court in London, immortalized as Hajji Baba by diplomat James Morier. According to Sir Justin Sheil:

Epilogue
The alliance between France and the Ottoman Empire was maintained, and a peace settlement was brokered between Russia and the Ottomans, but the territories the Ottomans had been promised (Moldavia and Wallachia) through the Treaty of Tilsit were never returned, although the Ottomans themselves had complied with their part of the agreement by moving their troops south of the Danube.

Meanwhile, a Russo-Persian war raged on despite France and Russia's efforts to try to reach a settlement between Russia and Persia. In 1812 Persia had to face a major defeat against Russia at the Battle of Aslandoz, forcing the Shah to negotiate the Treaty of Gulistan, on 12 October 1813, which resulted in huge territorial (and eventually irrevocable) integral territorial losses for Iran in its territories in the Caucasus region, comprising modern-day Georgia, Dagestan, and most of the contemporary Republic of Azerbaijan, per the Treaty of Gulistan of 1813.

In 1812, through the Treaty of Bucharest, the Ottoman Empire and Russia also agreed to make peace, just as Russia was anxious to liberate this southern front in anticipation of Napoleon's Invasion of Russia, with Russia keeping Bessarabia and the Ottomans regaining Wallachia and Moldavia.

After the fall of Napoleon, a French officer named Jean-François Allard visited Abbas Mirza to propose his services. He was promised the position of a Colonel, but never actually received the troops corresponding to his function. In 1820, Allard left for Punjab where he played a great role.Chambers's encyclopaedia p.152

After a long period of exchanges between Persia and Great Britain, diplomatic relations with France resumed in 1839 following a dispute between Great Britain and Persia over the Afghanistan city of Herat. Great Britain would remove its military and diplomatic missions from Persia, and briefly occupy Kharg island and the city of Bushehr. Mohammad Shah Qajar would in turn resume diplomatic relations with France, and send a diplomatic mission to Louis-Philippe under Mirza Hossein Khan to obtain military help. In response, a group of French officers was sent to Persia with the returning ambassador.

In 1857, during the Anglo-Persian War (1856–1857), a Persian ambassador named Ferouk Khan was sent to Napoleon III, who expressed his regrets about the conflict. Negotiations led to the March 1857 Treaty of Paris, which put an end to the Anglo-Persian War.

See also
 Foreign alliances of France
 France-Near East relations
 France-Iran relations
Treaty of Finckenstein
 Franco-Ottoman alliance

Notes

References
 Yves Bomati and Houchang Nahavandi,Shah Abbas, Emperor of Persia,1587–1629'', 2017, ed. Ketab Corporation, Los Angeles, English translation by Azizeh Azodi.

1807 in international relations
1809 in international relations
Military alliances involving Iran
Military alliances involving France
1807 in France
19th century in France
19th century in Iran
France–Iran relations
1800s in Iran
History of the foreign relations of Iran
History of the foreign relations of France
1809 in France
1807 in Iran
1809 in Iran